Carlos Aneese "Sully" Kothmann (February 26, 1933 – May 5, 1986) was an American pair skater.  After winning the bronze medal with partner Kay Servatius at the 1953 U.S. National Championships, he teamed with Lucille Ash.  He and Ash were twice silver medalists at the U.S. Championships and finished seventh at the 1956 Winter Olympics.  He was born in San Antonio, Texas.

Results
(pairs with Ash)

References

Sully Kothmann's profile Sports Reference.com

1933 births
1986 deaths
American male pair skaters
Olympic figure skaters of the United States
Figure skaters at the 1956 Winter Olympics